Bracebridge/Spirit Bay Water Aerodrome  located on Spirit Bay, Lake Muskoka,  west northwest of Bracebridge, Ontario, Canada. It is open from mid-May to mid-October.

References

Registered aerodromes in Ontario
Transport in Bracebridge, Ontario
Seaplane bases in Ontario